Pan Hannian (18 January 1906 – 14 April 1977) was a major figure in the Chinese Communist intelligence by the early 1930s and until 1955. He began his work with the Chinese Communist Party (CCP) in 1926 as a propagandist with the editorial department of the magazine "Oazo" (Huanzhou) and later with "Crossroads" (Shizi Jietou). Pan became a CCP member in February 1927 and was assigned as managing editor of the "Revolutionary Army Daily" (Gemingjun Ribao) in Nanchang. Ordered to Shanghai for the entry of the KMT in April, Pan had barely arrived when the 12 April anti-communist coup forced him underground.  This may have been the time when Pan was first assigned intelligence duties.  Pan escaped Shanghai with Zhou Enlai to Wuhan, but eventually returned to Shanghai to take up a leadership position with their paramount intelligence organization, the CCP Central Committee Special Branch (Zhongyang Teke, CCSB).  He became the head of CCSB's Second Section (intelligence) and later the Third Section (Red Squads), in 1931-33 stayed on in Shanghai as the rest of Central Committee was evacuated under intense pressure from KMT intelligence and police in the Shanghai International Settlement and the Shanghai French Concession.  Pan eventually left Shanghai in 1933 and participated in the Long March, but returned to Shanghai and regularly visited Hong Kong after the 1935 Zunyi Conference.

In 1949 Pan was made a Deputy Mayor of Shanghai. On 3 April 1955 Pan was accused by the PRC Ministry of Public Security of "secretly seeking the assistance of the Japanese secret service organs and colluding with the major traitor Wang Jingwei".  Pan was imprisoned until his death in 1977 but was posthumously rehabilitated.

References
David P. Barnett and Larry Shyu, eds, Chinese Collaboration with Japan: 1932-1945 (Stanford University Press, 2001), pp. 5–6 and p. 9
Quan Yanchi, Secrets and Insider Stories of China (Zhongguo Miwen Neimu; Lanzhou: Gansu Wenhua Chubanshe, p. 44)
Warren Kuo, Analytical History of the Chinese Communist Party, Book 2 (Taipei: Institute of International Relations, 1969), pp. 285–287.
 解密:中共高层特工潘汉年究竟有没投靠过汪精卫 

1906 births
1977 deaths
Chinese prisoners and detainees
People's Republic of China politicians from Jiangsu
Chinese spies
Politicians from Wuxi
Chinese Communist Party politicians from Jiangsu
Political office-holders in Shanghai
People from Yixing